Daniel William "Spike" Gehlhausen (born November 19, 1954, in Jasper, Indiana), is a former driver in the USAC and CART Championship Car series.  He raced in 11 seasons (1975–1982 and 1984–1986), with 79 combined career starts, including the Indianapolis 500 in 1976, 1978–1980, and 1984. He finished in the top ten 15 times with his best finish in 4th position in 1980 at Ontario.

Indianapolis 500 results

External links
Driver DB Profile

1954 births
Champ Car drivers
Living people
Indianapolis 500 drivers
People from Jasper, Indiana
Racing drivers from Indiana
USAC Silver Crown Series drivers